Kappa Cygni, Latinized from κ Cygni, is a star in the northern constellation of Cygnus. It has an apparent visual magnitude of 3.8, which is bright enough to be seen with the naked eye. In the constellation, it forms the tip of Cygnus's left wing. The radiant of the minor Kappa Cygnids meteor shower is located about 5° north of this star.

Examination of this star's spectrum show it to match a stellar classification of G9 III, with the 'III' luminosity class revealing that it has consumed the hydrogen fuel at its core and expanded into the giant star stage of its stellar evolution. It is known to vary in luminosity, but only by about 0.01 to 0.02 magnitudes. At an estimated distance of  based on parallax measurements, this yields a physical size of about 8–9 times the radius of the Sun. The outer envelope has an effective temperature of 4,920 K, giving it the yellow-orange hue of a star near the transition from a G- to a K-type classification.

References

Cygnus (constellation)
Cygni, Kappa
Cygni, 01
094779
181276
BD+53 2216
7328
G-type giants
Suspected variables